Iman Maghsoudi is an Iranian–American industrial designer.

Biography 
Born in Tehran, he started experimenting with car design as a student of industrial design in Islamic Azad University and won the "Interior Motives Award in 2006" featuring Ferrari Monza concept, with which he managed to win three prizes: Overall winner, Best Conceptual Interior, and nominated for Best Innovation award. The jury called his design a "dramatic design [that] represents a vision of the future in which the considerations of space and resources will impact on the way people drive." In 2007, He won the Red Dot Awards for "Living Box" in the "Mobility" Category of Design Concepts, and the IDEA Design Excellence Awards. In 2012, he designed and led the Python concept car project in Iran.

After moving to America in 2013, he established his own design studio and became more involved in luxury design, business and entrepreneurship. In the same year, he helped with the launch of concept motorcycle "Ostureh" (Myth in Persian) that was featured at Big Boys Toys. He won the Local Motors Hawaii Motors Design competition in 2009 with project iBite, and in 2014 his Aeroblade concept won the second place in the world's first 3D Printed Car Design Competition.

He established Exxeo brand in 2017 for luxury products, and its first product, the Exxeo "Eclipse" Luxury Hybrid Piano won the Platinum A' Design Award. Nargess Banks wrote in Forbes that it is "designed to disrupt the traditional piano world" with an organic shape and carbon fiber body. World Piano News described the Exxeo Piano as "visually striking."

Awards

Gallery

References 

Living people
Iranian industrial designers
Iranian automobile designers
Iranian emigrants to the United States
1980 births